Christian Stephen Yelich (born December 5, 1991) is an American professional baseball left fielder for the Milwaukee Brewers of Major League Baseball (MLB). He previously played for the Miami Marlins.

The Marlins selected Yelich in the first round of the 2010 MLB draft. He made his MLB debut for the Marlins in 2013, and was traded to the Brewers in the 2017-18 offseason. Yelich won a Gold Glove Award in 2014, the Silver Slugger Award in 2016, 2018 and 2019, and the National League's Most Valuable Player Award in 2018.

Career

Amateur career
Yelich was born in Thousand Oaks, California, and attended Westlake High School. During his freshman year, he batted .373 with 25 hits and 16 strikeouts in 67 at bats.  In his sophomore year, he batted .341 with 31 hits and 24 strikeouts in 91 at bats. During Yelich's junior year, he batted .489 with 46 hits and struck out 6 times. In his senior year, he batted .451 with 37 hits, nine strikeouts and nine home runs in 82 at bats.  He was named Second Team All-American by Max Preps and was ranked 34 among the top 100 players in the nation in high school.

Yelich accepted a scholarship to play college baseball for the Miami Hurricanes baseball team.

Professional career

Miami Marlins

The Miami Marlins selected Yelich in the first round, with the 23rd overall selection, in the 2010 MLB draft. Yelich and the Marlins agreed to a $1.7 million signing bonus on August 17, shortly before the deadline to sign 2010 draftees was about to pass. Yelich played for the Gulf Coast League Marlins for six games, getting nine hits and seven strikeouts with a batting average of .375 before being advanced to Class-A. He played in six games for the Greensboro Grasshoppers in 2010, batting .348. In 2011, he batted .261 with 43 hits, six strikeouts and four home runs. Yelich was named the Marlins' Minor League Player of the Year in both 2011 and 2012.

On July 23, 2013, the Marlins promoted Yelich to the MLB from the Double-A Jacksonville Suns.

In the 2014 season, Yelich batted .284 with 31 steals out of the leadoff spot for the Miami Marlins. He also won a Gold Glove Award in left field, becoming the franchise's youngest ever player and first outfielder to win the award. During the season, Yelich set a franchise record for fielding percentage in left field, at .996. He served as the final out of Jordan Zimmermann's no-hitter on September 28, 2014, when Steven Souza Jr. made a diving play to save the no-hitter.

Yelich and the Marlins finalized a seven-year, $49.57 million contract extension on March 22, 2015. He struggled to start the season, and was placed on the disabled list in April with lower back strain before making his return on May 8. His batting average reached a season low of .178 on May 22. In August, Yelich bruised his right knee and was again placed on the disabled list. Yelich had improved from his earlier offensive struggles and was hitting .275/.343/.376 with six home runs, 29 RBIs and 14 stolen bases up to that point in the season. Despite aggravating the injury shortly after his return, Yelich remained an active player for the quality of his bat. Near the end of the season, Yelich shared the field with Marcell Ozuna, the outfielder who had replaced him during his second stint on the disabled list. Yelich closed the 2015 season with a .300 average. For the season, he had the highest ground ball percentage (62.5%), and the lowest fly ball percentage (15.0%), of all major league hitters.

Yelich was projected to bat third to start 2016. He hit well in that spot, and managed to increase his power output. On April 23, in a game against the San Francisco Giants, Yelich hit three doubles, which tied a franchise record. Defensively, Yelich was a starting outfielder, alongside Ozuna and Giancarlo Stanton. In late May, Yelich missed some time due to back spasms. After Stanton was placed on the disabled list, Ozuna played Stanton's usual position in right field, while Yelich took Ozuna's spot in center on days that backup outfielder Ichiro Suzuki was unavailable.

Milwaukee Brewers
On January 25, 2018, the Marlins traded Yelich to the Milwaukee Brewers for Lewis Brinson, Isan Díaz, Monte Harrison, and Jordan Yamamoto. Yelich was named to the 2018 MLB All-Star Game after batting .285 with 11 home runs, 36 RBIs, and 11 stolen bases. Yelich, a reserve for the National League, replaced Matt Kemp in left field and went 1-for-3, hitting a solo home run in an 8–6 extra-inning loss to the American League. On August 29, Yelich hit for the cycle against the Cincinnati Reds, collecting a total of six hits in the game. On September 2, Yelich hit his first career grand slam, in a game against the Washington Nationals. On September 17, Yelich hit for the cycle, also against the Cincinnati Reds, for the second time in 19 days, becoming the fifth player in MLB history to hit two cycles in the same season and the first player in MLB history to do so against the same team.

Yelich finished the 2018 season with a .326/.402/.598 slash line, 36 homers, and 110 RBIs, winning the first NL batting title in Brewers history, while narrowly falling short of a triple crown. He also was 2nd in the league in power-speed number (27.3).  On October 26, Yelich was announced as the National League recipient of the annual Hank Aaron Award. On November 16, Yelich was named Most Valuable Player of the National League, falling one vote shy of a unanimous selection.

On March 31, 2019, Yelich became the sixth player in MLB history to hit a home run in each of his team's first four games.

On July 1, 2019, Yelich became the first player in Brewers franchise history to reach 30 home runs before the All-Star Break, beating former Brewer Prince Fielder's record of 29 home runs. Yelich was selected to participate in the Home Run Derby but had to withdraw due to a back injury. He was replaced by Matt Chapman in the Home Run Derby. On September 10, 2019, Yelich hit a foul ball off his kneecap and left the game. Shortly thereafter, it was revealed that his right kneecap was fractured, which prematurely ended his 2019 season.

In 2019, Yelich won his second National League batting title. He batted .329/.429 (leading the NL)/.671 (leading the major leagues) with a 1.100 OPS (leading the majors), 44 home runs (4th in the NL), 11.1 at bats per home runs (leading the league), a .342 ISO (leading the NL), 30 stolen bases (3rd), a 93.75 stolen base percentage (3rd), and 97 RBIs in 130 games. He had the highest Hard Contact Percentage of all National League batters, at 50.8%. Yelich was the first National League player to lead the league in batting average and slugging percentage in consecutive seasons since Rogers Hornsby, who did so from 1920 to 1925. He won the NL Hank Aaron Award for the second year in a row and finished second in NL MVP voting.

After the 2019 season, Yelich became the only player in Major League Baseball history to have consecutive seasons hitting .325 or higher with 35 or more homers and 20 or more steals.

On March 6, 2020, Yelich signed a nine-year, $215 million contract extension with the Brewers, more than doubling Ryan Braun's previous record of $105 million for the richest contract in franchise history. In the shortened 60-game 2020 season, he hit .205/.356/.430 with 12 home runs.

At the start of the 2021 season, Yelich had a lingering back problem that caused him to spend over half of the months of April and May on the injured list.

Yelich hit his third career cycle on May 11, 2022, becoming the sixth player in MLB history to do so, and the first player to accomplish three cycles against the same team, the Cincinnati Reds.

In 2022, he had the highest ground ball percentage of all major leaguers (58.6%), and the lowest fly ball percentage (23.0%), and batted .252/.355/.383.

International career
Yelich played for the United States national baseball team in the 2017 World Baseball Classic. Following the conclusion of the tournament, he was named to the All-World Baseball Classic team.

On September 10, 2018, he was selected to play with the MLB All-Stars at the 2018 MLB Japan All-Star Series, but he later withdrew from the event.

Personal life
Yelich is the eldest child of Stephen and Alecia Yelich, and the great-grandson of American football player Fred Gehrke, who played for the Los Angeles Rams and the San Francisco 49ers. Additionally, his uncle, Chris Yelich, played for the UCLA Bruins. He has two brothers: Collin, who played minor league baseball in the Atlanta Braves Organization, and Cameron Yelich, who is a member of the United States Marine Corps.

Yelich's paternal great-grandfather was a Serb from Trebinje, Bosnia and Herzegovina. Christian Yelich was baptized in the Serbian Orthodox Church as Risto Šćepan Jelić. His maternal grandfather was Japanese.

Yelich appeared (as himself) in an episode of Magnum P.I. that aired on March 4, 2019. His scene was with the 2018 Honolulu Little League World Champions in which he homers off a pitch from series protagonist Orville "Rick" Wright (played by Zachary Knighton). Yelich once invited Cleveland Browns quarterback and 2017 Heisman Trophy winner Baker Mayfield to Brewers batting practice.

Yelich grew up both a Los Angeles Dodgers fan and a New York Yankees fan.

Yelich owns property in Malibu, California. In October 2021, he purchased a $6.5 million home in Paradise Valley, Arizona from NHL player Oliver Ekman-Larsson.

See also

 List of Major League Baseball single-game hits leaders
 List of Major League Baseball players to hit for the cycle
 List of Milwaukee Brewers award winners and All-Stars
 Miami Marlins award winners and league leaders

References

External links

1991 births
Living people
American baseball players of Japanese descent
American people of German descent
American people of Serbian descent
Baseball players from California
Gold Glove Award winners
Greensboro Grasshoppers players
Gulf Coast Marlins players
Jacksonville Suns players
Jupiter Hammerheads players
Major League Baseball left fielders
Miami Marlins players
Milwaukee Brewers players
Nashville Sounds players
National League batting champions
National League Most Valuable Player Award winners
New Orleans Zephyrs players
People from Thousand Oaks, California
Phoenix Desert Dogs players
Silver Slugger Award winners
Sportspeople from Ventura County, California
World Baseball Classic players of the United States
2017 World Baseball Classic players